Gary Richard Darling (born October 9, 1957) is a former umpire in Major League Baseball. He wore uniform number 37 (though he wore #35 during his NL tenure).

Umpiring career
Darling attended Luther Burbank High School in Sacramento, California. He umpired the 2003 and 2010 World Series, the National League Championship Series (1992, 2004, 2006, 2011, 2012), two All-Star Games (1993, 2003), and ten Division Series (1995, 1997, 1998, 2002, 2003, 2005, 2007, 2008, 2010, 2013).

Darling is credited with a game that occurred prior to his MLB debut. Because Wrigley Field did not have lights in 1986, when the April 20, 1986 game reached the 14th inning, and Pittsburgh and the Cubs still being tied, the game was suspended due to darkness. The game was then completed on August 11, 1986, a different umpiring crew entered the game in the 14th inning, with Darling replacing Randy Marsh as the first base umpire.

Darling was behind the plate when Roger Clemens achieved the double milestones of 300 wins and 4,000 strikeouts on June 13, 2003.

Darling was chosen as one of the umpires for the one-game Wild Card playoff between the Baltimore Orioles and the Texas Rangers on October 5, 2012.

Retirement 
After beginning the 2014 season on umpiring's disabled list, the Umpire Ejection Fantasy League reported the rumor of Darling's retirement from baseball on July 2. Major League Baseball confirmed the report on July 4, concluding Darling's 28 years of service. He was replaced on the MLB staff by 28-year-old minor league call-up umpire Quinn Wolcott.

Personal life
Darling spends much of his off season doing charity work for Umps Care, the MLB professional umpire's charity, and currently serves as the charity's president.

See also

List of Major League Baseball umpires

References

External links
Major league profile
Retrosheet
Umpire Ejection Fantasy League profile
Umps Care Charities

1957 births
Living people
Sportspeople from San Francisco
Major League Baseball umpires